Serdar Sabuncu (born 22 October 1977) is a Turkish football manager who is the manager of TFF Third League club Muş 1984 Muşspor.

Managerial career
Never a footballer, Sabuncu graduate with a degree in sports in 2001 and began working at the youth academy of Altay in 2007. He had several stints at youth academies and clubs in Turkey. He has been the head of the youth academies of İzmirspor, Altınordu, Göztepe, Bucaspor, and İstanbul Başakşehir. He was the manager of the semi-pro sides Tirespor 1922, Altay, 24 Erzincanspor and İzmirspor. He returned to Göztepe's youth academy on 2 August 2021. On 6 May 2022, Sabuncu was named the interim manager at Göztepe in the Süper Lig after Stjepan Tomas was sacked.

References

External links
 
 Serdar Sabuncu manager profile at TFF.org
 Serdar Sabuncu manager profile at Mackolik.com 

1977 births
Living people
Sportspeople from İzmir
Turkish football managers
Altay S.K. managers
İzmirspor managers
Göztepe S.K. managers
Süper Lig managers